Christophe Lowinsky (born 5 May 1992) is a Martiniquais footballer who plays as a defender for Luzenac.

Career

Lewinsky started his career with OM.
In 2012, he received interest from Tottenham.
In 2013, he trialed for Sparta.
In 2013, Lowinsky signed for French fifth tier side ES Pennoise after trialing for Newcastle in the English Premier League. In 2016, he signed for San Lorenzo (Paraguay) in the Paraguayan second tier. After that, he signed for French tenth tier team Montredon - Bonneveine. In 2018, Lowinsky signed for Luzenac in the French sixth tier. In 2021, he signed for JS Cugnaux.

References

External links

 

Martinique international footballers
Living people
Club Sportivo San Lorenzo footballers
Martiniquais expatriate footballers
Expatriate footballers in France
1992 births
Luzenac AP players
Expatriate footballers in Paraguay
Association football defenders
Martiniquais footballers